WDHC may refer to:

 WDHC-LD, a low-power television station (channel 6) licensed to serve Lebanon, Kentucky, United States
 WXDC, a radio station (92.9 FM) licensed to serve Berkeley Springs, West Virginia, United States, which held the call sign WDHC from 1996b to 2017